Leonard King (born July 3, 1966) is an American former professional basketball player. He was a star player for the Otago Nuggets in the New Zealand National Basketball League from 1991 to 1998.

King is the 4th All-time leading scorer in the history of the NBL averaging 25.6 points a game. He teamed up with former New Zealand Tall Black skipper Glen Denham to provide a formidable duo for the Nuggets. King returned to the Nuggets for the 2004 season.

Originally from Cleveland Heights, Ohio, a suburb of Cleveland, King graduated from Cleveland Heights High School in 1984.  He was selected as the Player of the Year for the Lake Erie League.  He graduated of Florida A&M University and averaged 22 points in his senior year. An honorable mention All-American, he tried out with the Minnesota Timberwolves of the National Basketball Association before heading to New Zealand. King also played in Germany, Italy, Portugal and Luxembourg. 

King worked for Basketball New Zealand as their High Performance coach and assistant coach of the New Zealand Men's National team Tall Blacks in 2005 and 2006. He coached the Mackay Meteors in the Australian Queensland Basketball League (QBL) from 2007 to 2010, twice being named the QBL Coach of the year (2009 & 2010) an award which is determined by the other coaches in the League.

King's son, Mojave, is a professional basketball player in the Australian National Basketball League.

References

External links
College statistics

1966 births
Living people
American expatriate basketball people in Germany
American expatriate basketball people in Italy
American expatriate basketball people in Luxembourg
American expatriate basketball people in New Zealand
American expatriate basketball people in Portugal
American men's basketball players
Basketball players from Cleveland
Florida A&M Rattlers basketball players
Otago Nuggets players